Henry Clay  is a 1929 bronze sculpture by Charles Henry Niehaus depicting the lawyer and politician Henry Clay, installed in the United States Capitol in Washington D.C. as part of the National Statuary Hall Collection. It is one of two statues donated by the state of Kentucky. The statue was accepted into the collection by Virgil Chapman on March 3, 1929.

The statue is one of eight that Niehaus has had placed in the collection.

A plaster version of the work, painted to resemble bronze, is located in the Kentucky State Capitol in Frankfort. A gift from the Kentucky State Bar Association, it was dedicated on November 19, 1930.

References

External links
 

1929 establishments in Washington, D.C.
1929 sculptures
Bronze sculptures in Washington, D.C.
Monuments and memorials in Washington, D.C.
Clay, Henry
Sculptures of men in Washington, D.C.